Vojtěch Ignác Ullmann (23 April 1822 in Prague – 17 September 1897 in Příbram) was a Czech architect working in Revivalism architecture, particularly Renaissance Revival architecture.

Life
Ullmann studied architecture at the Academy of Fine Arts in Vienna with professors August Sicard von Sicardsburg and Eduard van der Nüll. After finishing his studies, he travelled to Italy. From 1854 he worked as an architect in Prague.

He often collaborated with the architect Antonín Viktor Barvitius, whose sister he married in 1856. By 1874 he had designed a number of buildings in Prague.

Design style
In Ullmann's early work we see echoes of medieval stylistic elements (see the Church of Saints Cyril and Methodius in Prague 8 - Karlín). In the next phase of his work, he was significantly influenced by the Viennese renaissance school.

Work

Prague
 Church of Saints Cyril and Methodius (Karlín), Karlínské Square. Prague 8
 Czech Polytechnic, Karlovo Square 13, Prague 1, (today a part of the Czech Technical University in Prague)
 Czech Savings Bank, today the headquarters of the Czech Academy of Sciences, Narodni 3, Prague 1
 Villa Lanna, Pelléova 24, Praha 6, now owned by the Czech Academy of Sciences
 Lažanský palace, Smetanově nábřeží 2, Prague 1, home of Café Slavia
 Letna chateau, Letenské sady 341, Prague 7
 Schebek Palace, Politických vězňů 7, Prague 1, home to CERGE-EI
 Sokol house of Sokol Pražský, Sokolská 43, Prague 2
 Spanish Synagogue, Vězeňská 1, Prague 1
 Vodičkova Girls' high school, Vodičkova 22, Prague 1, now an elementary school (ZŠ Vodičkova)

Outside of Prague
Town hall in Příbram

Gallery

References

1822 births
1897 deaths
Architects from Prague
Railway architects
19th-century Czech architects
Academy of Fine Arts Vienna alumni